TVNorge HD is a High Definition television channel in Norway. The channel is a joint venture by TVNorge and cable and satellite-TV distributor Canal Digital which started broadcasting on October 3, 2008. It's the first Norwegian high definition channel, but currently only some of its contents is available in HD (HBO shows like Rome and other American series like Terminator: The Sarah Connor Chronicles). The HD station has the same schedule as the SD station. Broadcasts not available in high definition are broadcast in standard definition.

Current content in high definition 
 Mrs. Nota
 The Big Bang Theory
 CSI: Crime Scene Investigation
 CSI: NY
 CSI: Miami
 The War At Home
 Terminator: The Sarah Connor Chronicles
 The Closer
 Rome
 Lost
Hugo and Ident

Norwegian content 
 Titi Ελένη Φουρέιρα
 I kveld med YLVIS
 71° nord

See also 
 List of Norwegian television channels
 List of programs broadcast by TVNorge

References

External links 
 Official Site
 TVNorge Television Schedule

Television channels in Norway

ProSiebenSat.1 Media